Timothy John Foley (born May 30, 1958) is a former American football offensive tackle who played for the Baltimore Colts of the National Football League (NFL). He played college football at the University of Notre Dame.

Foley was a three-year starter for the Notre Dame Fighting Irish under head coach Dan Devine. Foley played left tackle and blocked for quarterback Joe Montana. In 1977, the Fighting Irish were voted consensus national champions after defeating the previously unbeaten and No. 1 ranked Texas Longhorns in the Cotton Bowl Classic. During his senior year, Foley was named a team captain, along with running back Vagas Ferguson and safety Dave Waymer. Foley was a consensus College Football All-America team selection in 1979.

Foley was selected in the second round of the 1980 NFL Draft by the Baltimore Colts. After three seasons with the Colts, he ended his professional football career in 1982.

Currently, Foley works at a life insurance and health group benefits company with his brother Dave Foley, who is a 1968 National Champion for the Ohio State Buckeyes and a former professional offensive lineman. Foley Benefits Group, LLC is based in Springfield, Ohio.

References 

1958 births
Living people
American football offensive tackles
Notre Dame Fighting Irish football players
Baltimore Colts players